Thurlow Gault Essington (May 19, 1886 – December 19, 1964) was an American lawyer and politician.

Biography
Essington was born in Streator, Illinois. He went to the Streator public schools and graduated from the Streator Township High School. Essington graduated from the University of Illinois in 1906 and the University of Chicago Law School in 1908. He was admitted to the Illinois bar. He lived in Streator with his wife and family. Essington served as Streator city attorney and as mayor of Streator. Essington served in the Illinois Senate from 1919 until 1927 and was a Republican. In 1924, Essington ran for the Republican nomination for Governor of Illinois and lost the race. He died at a convalescent home in Streator, Illinois.

References

External links

1886 births
1964 deaths
People from Streator, Illinois
University of Illinois Urbana-Champaign alumni
University of Chicago Law School alumni
Mayors of places in Illinois
Republican Party Illinois state senators
20th-century American politicians